Ixia dubia  is an Ixia species found growing in granite slopes from Piketberg to Caldon, South Africa.

References

External links

dubia
Endemic flora of South Africa
Plants described in 1803